Jakob Henrik Gerhard Fjelde (April 10, 1859 – May 5, 1896) was a Norwegian-born American sculptor.
He is remembered as both a prolific portraitist and the creator of public monuments.  One of his better known works is the one dedicated to the 1st Minnesota Infantry (1897) located at Gettysburg Battlefield where its 262 members suffered 215 casualties.

Background
Jakob Henrik Gerhard Fjelde was born at Ålesund in Møre og Romsdal, Norway. His father, Paul Gerhard Michelet Fjelde (1827–1873), was a skilled carpenter and wood carver. He  had moved to the United States in 1872, but died the following year. Jakob  Fjelde  was a pupil of Brynjulf Bergslien during 1878. He studied at the  Academy of Fine Arts in Copenhagen from 1879 to 1881 and was a student of  Vilhelm Bissen 1880–1882.  He travel abroad, living in Rome from 1882 to 1884. Fjelde lived and worked to Bergen, Norway from 1884 until 1887 when he immigrated to the United States. After arriving in America he settled in Minneapolis, Minnesota. The following year he married the Danish-born Margrethe Madsen. They eventually had four children.  He was the father of sculptor Paul Fjelde and the brother of artist Pauline Fjelde. His grandsons included Ibsen scholar Rolf G. Fjelde.

Career
At the Industrial Exposition in Minneapolis during 1889 and 1890,  Fjelde presented 18 busts and relief portraits, including marble busts of Sven Oftedal and Georg Sverdrup, both of whom would serve as Presidents of Augsburg College and were founders of the Lutheran Free Church . At the World's Columbian Exposition in Chicago during 1893, he presented a bust of the Norwegian-American politician Knute Nelson.

Jakob Fjelde had first sculpted Henrik Ibsen from life in Molde, Norway during 1885. Although Ibsen disliked sitting for artists, he took a liking to the precocious young sculptor, then 26 years old, and patiently sat for the bust.

Death and legacy
Fjelde died in Minneapolis on May 5, 1896.

The  Minneapolis-St. Paul area hosts several of his major public bronze outdoor monuments. One is Hiawatha and Minnehaha, a statue of Hiawatha carrying Minnehaha based on characters from Henry Wadsworth Longfellow's 1855 poem The Song of Hiawatha. The statue was created for the Columbian Exposition in 1893 and permanently erected in 1912. Another, in Loring Park in  Minneapolis,  is of Norwegian violin virtuoso Ole Bull was cast in 1897, a year after Fjelde's death. The Minerva bronze sculpture is located in the downtown Minneapolis Central Library.

Among his portraits of Ibsen, several are noteworthy. One is located in Tacoma, Washington in Wright Park, another is at the North Dakota State College of Science in  Wahpeton, North Dakota.  Another bust of Ibsen, located in  the Como Park, Zoo, and Conservatory in St. Paul, Minnesota was stolen from the Park in 1981. The sculpture was recovered, restored, and reinstalled by Public Art Saint Paul in 1999.

Gallery

References

Further reading
Hansen, Carl G. O. My Minneapolis. (Minneapolis, MN: Standard Press, 1956) pp. 159–165 and pp. 169–170.
Coen Rena Neumann  (1976)  Painting and Sculpture in Minnesota, 1820-1914 (University of Minnesota Press)

External links

Sculptor Jakob Fjelde 01
Sculptor Jakob Fjelde 02
Marie Dreis Scheffer bust 
Ole Bull statue at Loring Park
Hiawatha and Minnehaha at MNOPEDIA 
Hiawatha and Minnehaha at Minnehaha Falls
Henrik Ibsen bust at Wright Park in Tacoma
Jakob Hendrik Gerhard Fjelde with his siblings
"An Artist's Odyssey" in Twin Cities magazine, March 1986
Minnesota- 1st Infantry Memorial at Gettysburg Nat'l Military Park 
Online book
My Minneapolis: Nasjonalbiblioteket
The Ole Bull Monument 
Burton Hall at the University of Minnesota
The History of Burton Hall
Spandrel figures by Jakob Fjelde in the interior of Burton Hall
Hennepin County Library
Minerva statue outside of Minneapolis Central Library at 10th and Hennepin  
Minerva statue inside  Minneapolis Central Library at 300 Nicollet Mall
Minnesota Historical Society
Ole Bull statue at Loring Park
Henrik Ibsen bust at Como Park
Hiawatha and Minnehaha statue at Minnehaha Park

1859 births
1896 deaths
19th-century American sculptors
19th-century American male artists
American male sculptors
Artists from Minneapolis
Norwegian emigrants to the United States
People from Møre og Romsdal
People from Ålesund
Sculptors from Minnesota